The 2022–23 Norfolk State Spartans women's basketball team represents Norfolk State University in the 2022–23 NCAA Division I women's basketball season. The Spartans, led by seventh-year head coach Larry Vickers, play their home games at the Joseph G. Echols Memorial Hall in Norfolk, Virginia as members of the Mid-Eastern Athletic Conference.

Roster

Schedule

|-
!colspan=9 style=| Non-conference regular season

|-
!colspan=9 style=| MEAC regular season

|-
!colspan=9 style=| MEAC Women's Tournament

|-
!colspan=9 style=| NCAA Women's Tournament

See Also
 2022–23 Norfolk State Spartans men's basketball team

References

Norfolk State Spartans women's basketball seasons
Norfolk State Spartans
Norfolk State Spartans women's basketball
Norfolk State Spartans women's basketball
Norfolk State